Lyndon Sands (born 6 February 1964) is a Bahamian athlete. He competed in the men's long jump at the 1984 Summer Olympics.

References

1964 births
Living people
Athletes (track and field) at the 1984 Summer Olympics
Bahamian male long jumpers
Olympic athletes of the Bahamas
Place of birth missing (living people)